Jack Lillard Coleman Jr. (born October 1, 1953) is an American politician in the state of Kentucky. He served in the Kentucky House of Representatives from 1991 to 2004. Coleman also was a city commissioner of Harrodsburg, Kentucky from 2016 to 2018. Coleman also served on the Burgin Independent School Board and served as vice-chair of the school board.

Coleman's father, Jack Sr., played in the National Basketball Association. His daughter, Jacqueline, was elected Lieutenant Governor of Kentucky in 2019.

References

External links

1953 births
Living people
Kentucky city council members
School board members in Kentucky
Democratic Party members of the Kentucky House of Representatives
Eastern Kentucky University alumni
People from Harrodsburg, Kentucky
Politicians from Lexington, Kentucky